The 1948 West Virginia gubernatorial election took place on November 2, 1948, to elect the governor of West Virginia. James Kay Thomas unsuccessfully ran for the Democratic nomination.

Results

References

1948
gubernatorial
West Virginia
West Virginia gubernatorial election